Christopher Ian Hussey (born 2 January 1989) is an English professional footballer who plays as a left-back for  club Stockport County.

Hussey spent his youth with Brentford and Woking, before earning a professional contract with AFC Wimbledon in 2007. He spent time on loan at Windsor & Eton and helped Wimbledon to progress from the Isthmian League Premier Division to the Conference Premier with two successive promotions. Hussey was signed by Championship club Coventry City in January 2010, and managed to become a regular starter for the team. He rejoined AFC Wimbledon in January 2013, who had by then won a place in the English Football League.

Hussey left Wimbledon and signed with Burton Albion in June 2013. He ended the 2013–14 season on loan at Bury and joined the club on a free transfer in May 2014. Hussey was promoted out of League Two with Bury in 2014–15 and was sold on to League One rivals Sheffield United in June 2016. He struggled for game time in the 2016–17 title-winning season and spent the 2017–18 season in League Two on loan at Swindon Town, before he joined Cheltenham Town on a free transfer in May 2018. Hussey helped Cheltenham to reach the play-offs at the end of the 2019–20 season; they won promotion the following season as League Two champions. He was named on the EFL League Two Team of the Season for the 2020–21 season. He was sold to Port Vale in January 2022 and joined Stockport County nine months later.

Career

Youth career
Hussey was a schoolboy with Brentford and joined Woking after being released from Brentford. He was released by Woking after failing to complete his college work, later admitting he was "a bit of a problem".

AFC Wimbledon

Early career (2006–2008)
Hussey joined AFC Wimbledon as a semi-professional in 2006 and worked as a carpet fitter alongside his father. After some impressive performances for Wimbledon's under-19 and reserve teams, he signed a contract at the end of the 2006–07 season. He suffered a twisted ankle during the club's pre-season tour of summer 2007 that saw him sidelined briefly. Hussey had a short stint on loan at Windsor & Eton, where he made 11 appearances in the Southern League Division One South & West.

After returning from his loan spell, Hussey made his debut for the "Dons" in a 4–0 win at Tonbridge Angels on 14 January 2008. Manager Terry Brown initially called Hussey up to the first-team to provide cover for injuries, before he went on to establish himself as the club's first-choice left-back. He scored his first career goal on 8 March, in a 2–0 win over Hendon. He scored again on 29 March, in a 4–2 win over Horsham at Kingsmeadow. Wimbledon were promoted into the Conference South with a 2–1 victory over Staines Town in the play-off final; Hussey was an unused substitute in the game. He made a total of 15 appearances and scored two goals in the 2007–08 season.

Conference (2008–09)
Hussey started the 2008–09 season well when he scored in a 1–0 win over Braintree Town on 2 September. He continued to be in the first-team, playing in the wing-back position, and made a total of 47 appearances as Wimbledon secured a second-successive promotion into the Conference Premier. In addition to winning a second-consecutive AFC Wimbledon Young Player of the Year Award for the 2008–09 season, he was named in the Conference South All Star Team of the Year. He started every match of the 2009–10 season until his departure in October, making a total of 79 league and cup appearances for Wimbledon.

Coventry City

Injury struggles (2009–2011)
On 16 October 2009, Hussey signed a loan deal with Championship side Coventry City until January 2010. He made his Football League debut four days later, in a 2–0 defeat to Cardiff City, replacing Patrick van Aanholt as a substitute in the 68th-minute. Manager Chris Coleman praised him for his performance after the match. On 1 January 2010, the move was made permanent for an undisclosed fee, reported as between £120,000 and £150,000, and he signed a contract to run until 2013. He spent most of the 2009–10 season on the bench, playing a total of eight times for the "Sky Blues".

Before the start of the 2010–11 season, Hussey suffered a foot injury during a friendly with West Bromwich Albion. Hussey remained on the sidelines until he returned to training in late-October. After returning from injury, he joined Crewe Alexandra on loan until 1 January 2011. Manager Aidy Boothroyd said that he hoped Hussey would benefit from Crewe manager Dario Gradi's vast experience. However, Hussey suffered a metatarsal injury during only his second training session at Crewe Alexandra, leading him to return to his parent club and spend three months in recovery. After returning from injury, he made his first appearance on 5 March, in a 4–1 loss against Bristol City. He was then given a handful of first-team appearances towards the end of the season, bringing Hussey's final seasonal appearance tally to 12. In the last game of the season, he set up both of Coventry's goals in a 2–2 draw with Norwich City.

Regular starter (2011–2013)
Hussey received more playing time at the start of the 2011–12 season under the management of Andy Thorn. However, in a 2–0 defeat to Barnsley on 1 October, Hussey gave away a penalty for handball and was substituted in the first half as a result. Despite this, he managed to regain his first-team place until he suffered another foot injury. After returning to the first-team, he assisted one of the goals in a 2–0 win over Portsmouth on 24 March. After returning from injury, Hussey featured in every match towards the end of the season as Coventry suffered relegation into League One. Despite struggling with injuries he made a total of 31 appearances in all competitions.

Other clubs made transfer enquiries for Hussey ahead of the 2012–13 season. He stayed at Coventry though and maintained a place in the first-team. He struggled for form, however, and was defended by manager Richard Shaw after being booed by home fans at the Ricoh Arena. Under the new management of Mark Robins though, Hussey soon lost his first-team place and was demoted to the substitute bench. Hussey's first, and only, goal for Coventry came in a 4–0 win against York City in the Football League Trophy on 9 October. His last appearance for the club came on 23 October, where he provided the assist for one of the goals in a 2–1 loss against Brentford. Hussey departed the club by mutual consent on 8 January 2013.

Return to AFC Wimbledon
On 10 January 2013, Hussey rejoined AFC Wimbledon, who had won promotion into the Football League during his absence. He made his second debut for Wimbledon on 12 January, when he came on as a second-half substitute in a 2–2 draw with Wycombe Wanderers. He soon established himself in the starting eleven and made 19 appearances in the second half of the 2012–13 season.

However, he was released in May 2013 after helping the club retain its Football League status. Shortly after his departure, Hussey said that he was released by the club for "footballing reasons." Manager Neal Ardley said that "he's a good player with fantastic quality... [but]  I asked him to do things that didn't play to his strengths" and that "he wasn't palmed off. We said at the moment we couldn't afford him".

Burton Albion
Hussey remained in League Two after signing with Burton Albion on 27 June 2013. He started for the "Brewers" on the opening game of the new season, a 2–2 draw with Cheltenham Town. He scored his first two goals for Burton in a 2–1 League Cup win over Sheffield United on 6 August. Eleven days later, he scored again in a 3–2 win over Fleetwood Town. In a match against Premier League club Fulham at the Pirelli Stadium on 27 August, in the second round of the League Cup, he set up both of Burton's goals in a 2–2 draw; the game ended in a 5–4 penalty shoot-out defeat despite Hussey successfully converting his penalty. However, as the season progressed, he soon lost his first-team place and struggled with injuries.

Hussey left the club on loan but returned to Burton when Gary Rowett's squad was hit with injuries. He made his return in the last game of the season, in a 1–0 loss against Southend United. He featured in all three games of the League Two play-offs, including in the 1–0 defeat to Fleetwood Town in the final at Wembley Stadium. After having made a total of 36 appearances in the 2013–14 season, scoring three goals, Hussey was released by the club after the two parties mutually agreed to waive his contract extension for a second season.

Bury

League Two (2014–15)
On 13 March 2014, Hussey joined League Two side Bury on loan for the remainder of the 2013–14 season. He made his debut for the "Shakers" two days later in a 0–0 draw with Southend United. On 22 March, he scored his first goal at Gigg Lane, in a 1–1 draw with Dagenham & Redbridge. After setting up one of the goals in a 2–1 win over Bristol Rovers on 1 April, he scored again four days later, in a 2–0 win over Exeter City. Hussey established himself in the starting eleven at Bury, until he was recalled by Burton Albion in late-April.

Hussey joined Bury on a free transfer following his release from Burton Albion, signing a two-year contract on 30 May 2014. His first game after signing for the club on a permanent basis came on the opening game of the 2014–15 season, in a 1–0 loss to Cheltenham Town. He established himself in the left-back position despite facing competition from other full-backs. Having provided 10 assists in 42 appearances throughout the season, Hussey helped the club to secure an automatic promotion place out of League Two.

League One (2015–16)
Hussey retained his left-back spot in the starting eleven for the 2015–16 League One campaign. He set up two goals in a 3–3 draw with Crewe Alexandra on 22 August. His contribution in the first half of the season won him praise from manager David Flitcroft. Hussey started every match until he was suspended in October for being sent off after receiving two yellow cards in a 2–2 home draw with Wigan Athletic. After returning from suspension, Hussey scored his first goal of the season, in a 4–3 win over Blackpool on 31 October. Flitcroft praised Hussey for his improvement as a defender, saying it had "improved by 60%" since his arrival at the club.

In November, Hussey signed a contract extension with Bury, keeping him at the club until 2018. He provided assists against Wigan Athletic in both the League Cup and FA Cup. He remained in the left-back position throughout the season despite "struggling for form and confidence" and made a total of 50 appearances for the Greater Manchester side, scoring one goal and providing nine assists. Overall he played 103 games for Bury, scoring three goals.

Sheffield United
Hussey was sold on to fellow League One club Sheffield United for an undisclosed fee on 2 June 2016. Along with Mark Duffy, Hussey was one of Chris Wilder's first two signings as manager. Hussey said the move was difficult to turn down. He made his debut for the "Blades" on the opening game of the 2016–17 season, in a 1–0 loss to Bolton Wanderers. He provided an assist for Billy Sharp in the following match against Rochdale, to give the club their first point of the season with a 1–1 draw at Bramall Lane. Hussey went on to lose his place at left-back in favour of Daniel Lafferty, and featured just seven times in the league.

Loan spell at Swindon Town (2017–18)
After being placed on a transfer list by Sheffield United, Hussey joined League Two side Swindon Town on a season-long loan on 7 July 2017. The move saw him reunited with former Bury manager David Flitcroft. He started the opening game of the 2017–18 season against Carlisle United when he set up one of the "Robins" goals in a 2–1 win. He then scored his first goal for the club on 9 September, in a 3–0 win over Luton Town. The goal was nominated for the League Two Goal of the Month award for September.

He was an ever-present in the side until he suffered a groin injury during a 2–0 win over Forest Green Rovers on 22 September. He was sidelined for six months and came back to fitness as Phil Brown was appointed to replace interim manager Matthew Taylor. On 3 May, following an alleged altercation with a fan after a defeat at Newport County, Hussey's loan spell at Swindon was terminated early and he was fined £4,000 by the FA and given a five-match suspension. He had played 20 games during his time at the County Ground. Hussey was released by Sheffield United at the end of the 2017–18 season.

Cheltenham Town

A strong start (2018–2020)
Hussey signed for Cheltenham Town on a two year-deal on 29 May 2018; manager Gary Johnson said that Hussey had "good age, good experience" and was "a good defender". Town struggled in the 2018–19 season, finishing 16th in League Two, with Hussey featuring 39 times in all competitions. He signed a contract extension in October 2019 to extend his contract until the summer of 2021. He was nominated for the League Two Player of the Month award the following February after helping the "Robins" to record six wins in seven games, and scoring a free kick in a 2–0 win at Colchester United. The goal went on to be voted as the club's goal of the season following an online poll by supporters. At the end of the 2019–20 season he helped the club reach the League Two play-offs, only to lose 3–2 on aggregate in the semi-finals against Northampton Town.

Promotion into League One (2020–2022)
In January 2021, Hussey signed a two-and-a-half-year contract extension. He was named on the Football Manager League Two Team of the Year for the 2020–21 season, along with teammate Will Boyle and manager Michael Duff. He missed just three league games during the campaign, making 48 appearances playing at left wing-back in a 3–5–2 formation in all competitions, as Cheltenham secured promotion into League One as champions of League Two. He scored one goal, a free kick against Carlisle United that sealed an automatic promotion place. On 29 April 2021, Hussey was named in the 2020–21 EFL League Two Team of the Season at the league's annual awards ceremony.

He made 28 appearances in the first half of the 2021–22 season and picked up a man of the match award in his final game for the "Robins", in a 1–1 draw with Burton Albion at Whaddon Road. Hussey played 155 games in three and a half seasons at Cheltenham, scoring four goals. Upon leaving the club, Hussey stated: "Cheltenham is where I've enjoyed my football the most and everyone has treated me unbelievably, this is the most a club has accepted me as a person and a player and every day I gave my all".

Port Vale
On 10 January 2022, Hussey signed for League Two club Port Vale, who paid Cheltenham an undisclosed fee. Manager Darrell Clarke said: "I've always been an admirer of his work, he's a proper professional and a proper winner", whilst director of football David Flitcroft had worked with Hussey at Bury and Swindon. Hussey told supporters the following month that "it took a couple of games for me to get into a rhythm which I think is normal for a new player", before he would help his new side go unbeaten in five games. He had his contract terminated on 1 September 2022 after finding a new club.

Stockport County
On 2 September 2022, he was announced as having signed with newly-promoted League Two side Stockport County until the end of the 2022–23 season; he had scored against the club in the EFL Trophy just three days previously. Manager Dave Challinor stated that "his experience, know how and previous success in the Football League will be really important for us going forward now".

International career
In February 2009, Hussey was called up to the England national C team as a standby.

Style of play
Hussey is a left-footed defender who can play at full-back or wing-back, and can also fill in on the left-side of midfield. He has always had good crossing and general attacking abilities, and has worked to improve his defending skills over the course of his career. He is also an accomplished set-piece taker.

Personal life
Hussey was described by the Coventry Telegraph as "a shy character". He worked with a clinical psychologist to overcome mental health struggles with anxiety and obsessive–compulsive disorder (OCD), which had left him addicted to sleeping tablets.

In June 2020, he graduated from Manchester Metropolitan University with a first class honours degree in exercise and sport science. He opened a mobile app-based discount business called Local & Loyal in July 2021, which aimed to support independently owned businesses in Worcestershire and Gloucestershire.

He has two children with his fiancée Cavella Dutson.

Career statistics

Honours
AFC Wimbledon
Isthmian League Premier Division play-offs: 2007–08
Conference South: 2008–09

Bury
League Two third-place promotion: 2014–15

Sheffield United
League One: 2016–17

Cheltenham Town
League Two: 2020–21

Individual
EFL League Two Team of the Season: 2020–21

References

1989 births
Living people
Footballers from Hammersmith
English footballers
Association football fullbacks
Brentford F.C. players
Woking F.C. players
AFC Wimbledon players
Windsor & Eton F.C. players
Coventry City F.C. players
Crewe Alexandra F.C. players
Burton Albion F.C. players
Bury F.C. players
Sheffield United F.C. players
Swindon Town F.C. players
Cheltenham Town F.C. players
Port Vale F.C. players
Stockport County F.C. players
Isthmian League players
National League (English football) players
Southern Football League players
English Football League players
Alumni of Manchester Metropolitan University